The 2013–14 Women's EHF Cup was the 33rd edition of EHF's second-tier women's handball competition. It started on 5 October 2013.

Qualifying stages

First qualifier

Second qualifier

Final stages

References

Women's EHF Cup
EHF Cup Women
EHF Cup Women